St. Gregory's College, St. Gregory College, or variants, may refer to:

 St. Gregory's University, formerly St. Gregory's College, Shawnee, Oklahoma, U.S.
 St Gregory's College, Campbelltown, in Sydney, New South Wales, Australia
 St Gregory's College, Lagos, in Nigeria
 Saint Gregory's Catholic College, in Odd Down, Bath, England
 St Gregory's Catholic Science College, in Kenton, London Borough of Harrow, England
 St. Gregory College of Valenzuela, in the Philippines
 Colegio de San Gregorio, a former college, now museum, in Valladolid, Castile and León, Spain
 Liceo Saint Gregory's, in Rosario, Rengo, Cachapoal Province, Chile

See also
 St Gregory's School (disambiguation)